Dolby E is a lossy audio compression and decoding technology developed by Dolby Laboratories that allows 6 to 8 channels of audio to be compressed into an AES3 digital audio stream that can be stored as a standard stereo pair of digital audio tracks.

Up to six channels, such as a 5.1 mix, can be recorded as 16-bit Dolby E data. However, if more than six channels are required, such as 5.1 plus a stereo LtRt, the AES3 data must be formatted as 20-bit audio. This increases capacity to eight channels.

Dolby E should never reach home viewers, as it is intended for use during post-production when moving multichannel material between production facilities or broadcasters. It is decoded prior to transmission.

It is very important to ensure that a Dolby E stream is never played through monitors or headphones without decoding. Undecoded Dolby E data will be converted to analog as full scale (0 dBFS) digital noise that can easily damage loudspeakers or hearing. Unambiguous media labeling is essential to avoid this.

Products
Dolby E encoding and decoding is implemented using commercially available hardware or software.

Hardware
Dolby DP571
Dolby DP572
Dolby DP568
Dolby DP580
Dolby DP591
Dolby DP600
Dolby DP600C

Software
 FFmpeg (only decoding)
 Avisynth (only decoding)
 Emotion Systems 'eNGINE'
 Minnetonka Audio 'AudioTools Server'
 Minnetonka Audio SurCode for Dolby E
 Neyrinck SoundCode For Dolby E

References

External links
Description from Dolby website
Dolby E - Multimedia Wiki

Digital audio
Dolby Laboratories